Piz Turba is a mountain of the Oberhalbstein Alps, located between Juf and Casaccia, west of the Septimer Pass, in the canton of Graubünden.

References

External links
 Piz Turba on Hikr

Mountains of Graubünden
Mountains of the Alps
Alpine three-thousanders
Mountains of Switzerland
Avers
Bregaglia
Surses